Rijs is a village within the municipality of De Fryske Marren in the province of Friesland, the Netherlands.

Rijs is situated on the road between Oudemirdum and Hemelum. It has approximately 170 citizens (2017).  Rijs is best known for its 300-year-old planted forest which known as Rijsterbos.

History
The village was first mentioned in 1333 as Riis and means branches. It is related to a grange of the Abbey of Staveren which was demolished in 1495 by Ygo Gales Galama, a Frisian warlord. Rijs was located on a sandy ridge. 

Huis Rijs was a stins (manor house) built in the 17th century. As part of the estate, a large forest was planted. The building was demolished in 1937, and replaced by a modern house.

In 1840, Rijs was home to 95 people. In 1916, the former brickworks of Rijs was used as a refugee camp for several hundred Belgian refugees.

Before 2014, Rijs was part of the Gaasterlân-Sleat municipality and before 1984 it was part of Gaasterland.

Gallery

References

External links

V-2 Rockets Launched From Rijs in WW2

De Fryske Marren
Populated places in Friesland